Chiswick Roundabout is a major roundabout, with flyover, in Chiswick, West London. It was opened in 1959, and is the meeting point of three roads which terminate here, the A205 South Circular, A315 Chiswick High Road, A406 North Circular; and one road which carries on through, and interfaces with the M4 – the A4 Great West Road – therefore it is extremely busy in daytime.

It is of one of Britain's first motorway junctions.

The M4 runs on a temporary WNW to ESE axis on the flyover.

It is also known as Gunnersbury roundabout.

Gallery

References

External links
 SABRE road lists

Road junctions in London
Transport in the London Borough of Hounslow
Roundabouts in England
Gunnersbury